Saundersfoot railway station is  from Saundersfoot, Pembrokeshire, Wales. It is managed by Transport for Wales Rail. It is usually a request stop apart from the limited-stop Great Western Railway Pembroke Dock services which make a scheduled stop here.

The station is just off of the B4316 road in the Pembrokeshire Coast National Park. The Pembrokeshire Coast Path is approximately    mile down the lane at St Issell's church.

A tunnel at King's Moor, which formed part of the old Saundersfoot Railway's second line running from the harbour to Thomas Chapel colliery near Begelly passes beneath the GWR station. The route of this old line now forms part of the Miners Walk.

Services
There are a pair of through trains to Cardiff each day and in the summer, two through Great Western Railway services to and one from London Paddington on Saturdays only. There are five trains each way on Sundays in summer and four in winter.

References

External links

Railway stations in Pembrokeshire
DfT Category F2 stations
Former Great Western Railway stations
Railway stations in Great Britain opened in 1866
Railway stations served by Great Western Railway
Railway stations served by Transport for Wales Rail
Railway request stops in Great Britain
1866 establishments in Wales